Terence Stanley Gray (March 21, 1938 – January 2, 2020) was a Canadian professional ice hockey forward who played 147 games in the National Hockey League for the Montreal Canadiens, Boston Bruins, Los Angeles Kings, and St. Louis Blues.

After a brief illness, Gray died on January 2, 2020, in Ottawa, Ontario.

Career statistics

Regular season and playoffs

References

External links
 

1938 births
2020 deaths
Boston Bruins players
Buffalo Bisons (AHL) players
Calgary Stampeders (WHL) players
Canadian ice hockey forwards
Cleveland Barons (1937–1973) players
Fort Worth Wings players
Hull-Ottawa Canadiens players
Kansas City Blues players
Kingston Frontenacs (EPHL) players
Los Angeles Kings players
Montreal Canadiens players
Montreal Voyageurs players
New Haven Nighthawks players
Pittsburgh Hornets players
Quebec Aces (AHL) players
Rochester Americans players
Sault Thunderbirds players
St. Louis Blues players
Ice hockey people from Montreal